Stanisław Sojczyński (nom de guerre "Warszyc") (March 30, 1910 in Rzejowice – February 19, 1947 in Łódź) was a captain in the Polish Army and in the Home Army and later the creator and leader of Underground Polish Army (KWP). On September 11, 2009, Stanisław Sojczyński was posthumously promoted to the rank of Brigadier General by President of Poland, Lech Kaczyński.

References

External link

1910 births
1947 deaths
People from Radomsko County
Polish soldiers
Home Army members